La Pierre Angulaire High School (or LAPAHS) is a private coeducational boarding school. It is located in Port Harcourt, Rivers State, Nigeria at 1 Maxwell Avenue, Mgbuoba. 

La Pierre Angulaire is French and means "The Rock at the Corner" or "The Corner Stone". The school holds Christian values with high esteem. Its motto is "The Fear Of God Brings Excellence."

External links

Schools in Port Harcourt
Secondary schools in Rivers State
Christian schools in Nigeria